Comic Relief USA was a non-profit charity organization whose mission is to raise funds to help those in need—particularly America's homeless. It has raised and distributed nearly US$50 million toward providing assistance—including health care services—to homeless people throughout the United States. Although Comic Relief's charity work is continuous, its fundraising events were held and televised at irregular intervals—and primarily by Home Box Office (HBO), with comedians Robin Williams, Billy Crystal, and Whoopi Goldberg as the hosts each time. They—along with many other comedians, celebrities, and occasional politicians—perform various segments—both general-purpose and specific to homelessness—of standup comedy, sketch comedy, speeches, live music, and impressions of persons and characters—all in order to entertain and enlighten. There are also documentary segments dealing with real-life problems of homeless people, in order to raise awareness of not only the grim realities but also how many hard-working "ordinary" people can wind up or grow up homeless. In exchange for contributions exceeding certain key amounts, T-shirts, sweatshirts and other merchandise are typically for sale.

Founding

Based on the Comic Relief charity in the United Kingdom and dedicated to the memory of comedian Andy Kaufman, the American organization was created in 1986 by comedy writer, producer, and actor Bob Zmuda. He worked with HBO executive Chris Albrecht to found the U.S. version in 1986.

Robin Williams, Billy Crystal, and Whoopi Goldberg were chosen to co-host Comic Relief's four-plus-hour maiden fundraiser. Other comics involved included Michael Keaton, Richard Dreyfuss, and Penny Marshall, as well as Bob Goldthwait, Howie Mandel, Minnie Pearl, and George Carlin. The first show netted US$2.5 million. According to the organization's website, more than $50 million has been raised since.

Chronology of events

Notes:
 * indicates a special event, or a compilation.
 Italics indicates a formal Comic Relief show.
 There has also been an A&E Network series, The Best of Comic Relief.

Disbursement
Generally, HBO and other sponsors pick up all (or most) of the costs of Comic Relief events, so that every (or nearly every) penny raised or contributed goes to the cause. Also, the hosts and other performers of Comic Relief events often get involved personally in projects run or supported by the charity.

 In Denver, Colorado, Paul Rodriguez helped open a medical facility made possible by Comic Relief funds; a woman holding a baby approached him, saying, "If it wasn't for Comic Relief, this child wouldn't have been born."
 In Chicago, Illinois, Bob Zmuda went to the Firehouse Annex of Chicago, Illinois—a home for alcoholic and battered women—and learned how, using Comic Relief funds, they were able to "take in a violent, alcoholic woman, slowly give her responsibilities and self-esteem, until she cleaned up and got a regular job."

Health Care for the Homeless (HCH)
Comic Relief distributes most of its funds raised to Health Care for the Homeless, which has project sites in 85 cities. This network of providers "was originally selected for start-up funding by the Robert Wood Johnson Foundation and the Pew Memorial Trust" after a year of review and assessment in 1985, was "co-sponsored by the U.S. Conference of Mayors", and works annually in all 50 states with thousands of homeless children.

HCH projects are created and run by their 104 organizational members in local communities.  Since 1 July 2008, 202 HCH guarantees of the federal government's Health Resources and Services Administration have been providing social services to "more than 740,000 clients" every year, combining HRSA funding with other revenue to provide a wide array of services. Comic Relief board member Dr. Pedro Jose "Joe" Greer, Jr. was awarded the Presidential Medal of Freedom in 2009 by President Barack Obama, on account of his "lifelong efforts to improve medical services for the homeless and uninsured."

Peripheral causes

Pets and Hurricane Katrina
In the wake of Hurricane Katrina (2006), Comic Relief made a point of rescuing pets and animals—and returning them to their owners when possible.

Comic Relief Wild: The Concert for Animals
A new internationally held and aired event, Comic Relief Wild: The Concert for Animals, addressed endangered species and habitat destruction around the world in 2007.

References

External links
 Archived website ComicRelief.org (now owned by Comic Relief, Inc.)

Charities based in California
Organizations established in 1986
1986 establishments in California